Benjamin Martin may refer to:

 Benjamin Martin (lexicographer) (1704–1782), English lexicographer and scientific instrument maker
 Benjamin F. Martin (1828–1895), politician, lawyer and teacher from Virginia and West Virginia
 Benjamin Brown Martin (1883–1932), American artist
 Benjamin Charles Stanley Martin (1891–1957), Royal Navy admiral
 Benjamin Martin (chess player) (born 1969), New Zealand chess master
 Benjamin Martin (author) (born 1984), author of the Samurai Awakening book series
 Benjamin Martin (field hockey) (born 1987), Canadian field hockey player
 Benjamin Martin, protagonist of the 2000 film The Patriot. A fictional character created from a composite of several historical officers

See also
 Ben Martin (disambiguation)
 Benny Martin (1928–2001), bluegrass musician
 Benjamin Marten (1690s–1752), physician

References